The Plekhanov Russian University of Economics is a public research university in Moscow, Russia. It was founded in 1907 by entrepreneur Alexei Vishnyakov as the first finance-specialized college in the Russian Empire. During the Soviet rule it became a large university.

In addition to accreditation by the Ministry of Education, the university has accreditations of the Association of Chartered Certified Accountants, European Council for Business Education and the Association of MBAs. PRUE is also a member of the European University Association (suspended in 2022 due to the 2022 Russian invasion of Ukraine), Association to Advance Collegiate Schools of Business, and the European Foundation for Management Development.

PRUE changed its name more than once: Moscow Commercial Institute (1907–1919); Karl Marx Moscow Institute of the National Economy (1919–1924); Plekhanov Moscow Institute of the National Economy (1924–1991); Plekhanov Russian Academy of Economics (1992–2010); Plekhanov Russian University of Economics (2010 to present). Recently, Plekhanov University acquired the Russian State University of Trade and Economics and the Moscow State University of Economics, Statistics, and Informatics.

History

The Moscow Commercial Institute was founded in 1907 on private donations of merchants, bankers and manufacturers, gathered at the initiative of Moscow merchant Alexei Vishnyakov. It was essentially the first institute in Russia which prepared qualified businessmen for rapidly developing branches of industry. Prior to the revolution of 1917, about 2,000 specialists were graduated from the institute. In 1924, it was renamed after Marxist thinker Georgi Plekhanov. In the 1960s, the institute was merged with the Moscow Governmental Economic Institute. After 1991, the institute obtained its current name. Recent years were marked with rising international cooperation, such as the foundation of the Africa Business House. Presently, the university deals with more than 80 partners in 52 countries. Among its graduates, there are many prominent politicians and businessmen, such as Soviet statesman Mikhail Suslov, liberal democrat Grigory Yavlinsky, and faculty member Ruslan Khasbulatov, former Chairman of the Supreme Soviet of the Russian SFSR and later Chairman of the Supreme Soviet of the Russian Federation (1991–1993).

Faculties (schools)
The university offers 4-year undergraduate (bachelor), 2-year graduate (master) and postgraduate (Ph.D.) courses in different academic fields as well as many non-degree courses. Some courses are available in English, but the majority of them are taught in Russian. A course may be completed at one of the university's schools:

 Institute of Management and Socio-Economic Projecting
 Faculty "Business School of Marketing and Entrepreneurship"
 Faculty "International Business School and Global Economics"
 Faculty "Integral Plekhanov Business School"
 Faculty of Hotel, Restaurant, Tourism, and Sports Industry
 Faculty of Distance Learning
 Faculty of Additional Professional Education
 Faculty of Marketing
 Faculty of Digital Economics and Information Technologies
 Faculty of Management
 Faculty of Economics and Law
 Faculty of Trade Economics
 Faculty of Online Education
 Faculty of Finance

Academics and research

According to a ranking of Russian universities, based on the average score of the Unified State Exam, Plekhanov University is among top 30 overall and among top 10 institutions specializing in social sciences.

In 1994, federal and regional research projects were started in "Peoples of Russia: Revival and Development", "Universities of Russia", "Preserving and Developing the Intellectual Potential of Russian Higher Education".

Of special interest is the establishment and accreditation of two laboratories dedicated to commodity expertise—in foodstuffs and microbiology.

During the last five years, 33 books were published by Plekhanov faculty members, as well as 58 collections of articles, 279 textbooks, and 1224 articles.

Plekhanov University collaborates with many universities from all over the world. It has established double degree programs primarily through its International Business School, IBS. Currently, Plekhanov University is working on attaining EQUIS accreditation.

Media
PRUE has its own bilingual TV channel, Plekhanov TV, available at every TV set on the campus, as well as Plekhanovets newspaper and Plekhanov Studio magazine. Some faculties release their own newspapers, e.g. FinFAQ magazine by Faculty of Finance. All of them are distributed for free within the university.

Campus
The university occupies eight buildings on one campus in the south of Moscow.

Partners
PRUE has more than one hundred partner schools in Europe, Asia and North America.

<div class="noprint">

Notable alumni

University alumni are employed in different spheres of Russian and world economy and politics. Its graduates and current students include:
 Tatyana Golikova, head of the Account Chamber of Russia, former Minister of Health and Social Development of the Russian Federation
 Grigory Yavlinsky, Russian economist and politician, founder of the political party Yabloko
 Mikhail Zadornov, president and chairman of VTB24 Bank, chairman of VTB Insurance, former Minister of Finance of the Russian Federation
 Valery Zubov, Senior MP in the State Duma
 Oleg Deripaska, billionaire, president of United Company RUSAL, founder of the Volnoe Delo Foundation
 Andrey Melnichenko, billionaire, chairman of Siberian Coal Energy Company, non-executive director of EuroChem
 Olga Dergunova, deputy chairman of VTB Bank, former head of the Federal Agency for State Property Management, former president of Microsoft in Russia and the CIS
 Tsolmon Onon, wife of former President, Prime Minister and Speaker of Parliament of Mongolia
 Kseniya Alexandrova, Miss Universe Russia 2017
 Khabib Nurmagomedov, current student; retired from MMA in 2020 as UFC lightweight champion
 Abul Barkat, economist, former Chairman of state-owned Janata Bank and former Chairperson of Department of Economics, University of Dhaka
 Arkadiy Novikov, the first Russian known entrepreneur restaurateur

See also
 List of business schools in Europe

References

External links
 
 Faculty of Finance

 
1907 establishments in the Russian Empire
Business schools in Russia
Economics schools
Educational institutions established in 1907
Public universities and colleges in Russia
Universities and colleges formed by merger
Universities and colleges in Moscow